The 2004 Milton Keynes Council election took place on 10 June 2004 to elect members of Milton Keynes Unitary Council in Buckinghamshire, England. One third of the council was up for election and the Liberal Democrats stayed in overall control of the council.

After the election, the composition of the council was:
Liberal Democrat 27
Labour 16
Conservative 7
Independent 1

Election result
The results saw no change in the political composition, with the Liberal Democrats remaining in control of the council. The closest result came in Middleton ward, with the Liberal Democrats holding the seat by 2 votes after 8 recounts. Overall turnout in the election was 37%, an increase of 10% on the 2003 election.

Ward results

References

2004 English local elections
2004
2000s in Buckinghamshire